Nordre Repøya is the northern island of the two Repøyane, off Orvin Land at Nordaustlandet, Svalbard. The island rises to a height of 230 m.a.s.l. It is separated from Søre Repøya by the sound Poortsundet. The island is named after Dutch whaler and map publisher Outger Rep van Oostzaan.

References

Islands of Svalbard